William Prosser may refer to:

William Lloyd Prosser (1898–1972), American legal scholar
William Henry Prosser (1870–1952), Welsh cricketer
William Prosser, Lord Prosser (1934–2015), Scottish judge
William Farrand Prosser (1834–1911), American politician